Diamonds Are Forever may refer to:
 Diamonds Are Forever (novel), a 1956 James Bond novel by Ian Fleming
 Diamonds Are Forever (film), a 1971 film adapted from the novel
 Diamonds Are Forever (soundtrack), a soundtrack album or its title song
 The Remix Album...Diamonds Are Forever, a 2000 remix album by Shirley Bassey
 Diamonds Are Forever, a 1999 album by Funky Diamonds
 Diamonds Are Forever, a 2006 album by Legs Diamond
 Diamonds Are Forever, a 2011 mixtape by Trina
 "Diamonds Are Forever", a song by Franck Pourcel from Strictly Breaks Volume 11
 "Diamonds Are Forever", a song from the musical Diamonds
 "Diamonds Are Forever", a song by Sabrina Carpenter from Singular: Act I

See also
 A Diamond is Forever, an advertising slogan of De Beers
 "Diamonds from Sierra Leone", a 2005 song by Kanye West, which samples the Shirley Bassey recording of "Diamonds Are Forever"
 "Diamonds Aren't Forever", a song by Bring Me the Horizon from Suicide Season